The 61st Primetime Emmy Awards were held on Sunday, September 20, 2009. CBS broadcast the Primetime event and E! broadcast the Creative Arts event; both took place at Nokia Theatre in Los Angeles, California. The nominations were announced on July 16, 2009.

On July 13, 2009, the Academy of Television Arts & Sciences announced that Neil Patrick Harris would host the Primetime ceremony (even going so far as to play Dr. Horrible at one point). The Creative Arts Emmy Awards for prime time were hosted by Kathy Griffin on September 12.

After the previous year's lackluster performance in ratings, the Primetime Emmy Awards were hoping to achieve success by selecting Harris as sole host, as opposed to a group of hosts as in the previous year. The 61st Primetime Emmy Awards earned a 4.2 rating in the 18–49 demo and drew 13.3 million, 1.1 million more than the previous year's all-time low.

30 Rock became the sixth show to win Outstanding Comedy Series three consecutive years, winning three major awards on that night. 30 Rock made history when it smashed the record for most major nominations by a comedy series with 18. The Cosby Show had held the record of 13 since 1986, while 30 Rock had tied this the previous year. The 18 major nominations became the third biggest record of all time, behind Roots record number of 21 in 1977 and NYPD Blues mark of 19 in 1994. These records still stand.

The drama field also crowned the defending champion, AMC's Mad Men. It won two major awards on that night. After airing for fifteen seasons, ER went out a winner as its series finale won for Outstanding Directing for a Drama Series. This was the first major win for ER since 2001.

Cherry Jones became the first from a Fox network show to win the award for Outstanding Supporting Actress in a Drama series but also the second female ever from Fox to win a Major Acting award since Gillian Anderson in 1997.

History was also made by The Daily Show with Jon Stewart and The Amazing Race. Both programs won their series categories for the seventh straight year, this broke the record for most consecutive victories in a major category of six that was held by The Mary Tyler Moore Show and Cagney & Lacey. The Amazing Race would lose the following year. However, in 2013, The Daily Shows streak was finally snapped by The Colbert Report, after a record of ten consecutive wins.

Winners and nominees
Winners are listed first and highlighted in bold:

Programs

Acting

Lead performances

Supporting performances

Hosting

Directing

Writing

Most major nominations
By network 
 HBO – 38
 NBC – 25
 CBS – 17
 ABC – 16
 AMC - 12
By program
 30 Rock (NBC) – 13
 Mad Men (AMC) – 9
 Damages (FX) / Grey Gardens (HBO) / Saturday Night Live (NBC) – 7
 Into the Storm (HBO) – 6

Most major awards
By network 
 NBC – 8
 HBO – 5
 CBS – 4
 AMC / PBS – 3
 ABC / Comedy Central / Fox / FX – 2

By program
 30 Rock (NBC) / Grey Gardens (HBO) / Little Dorrit (PBS) – 3
 The Daily Show with Jon Stewart (Comedy Central) / Mad Men (AMC) / Saturday Night Live (NBC) – 2

Notes

Presenters
The awards were presented by the following:

In Memoriam
The singer Sarah McLachlan performed the song "I Will Remember You" during the tribute:

 Edie Adams
 Gale Storm
 Van Johnson
 Eartha Kitt
 Neal Hefti
 Patrick McGoohan
 Morton Lachman
 Karl Malden
 James Whitmore
 Sam Cohn
 Henry Gibson
 Bill Melendez
 Pat Hingle
 Paul Benedict
 Bernie Hamilton
 Dom DeLuise
 Dominick Dunne
 Robert Prosky
 Fred Travalena
 Irving R. Levine
 Ron Silver
 Natasha Richardson
 David Carradine
 Nora O'Brien
 Michael Crichton
 Beatrice Arthur
 Ricardo Montalbán
 Ed McMahon
 Army Archerd
 Larry Gelbart
 Paul Newman
 Pierre Cossette
 Michael Jackson
 Patrick Swayze
 Don Hewitt
 Farrah Fawcett
 Walter Cronkite

References

External links
 Emmys.com list of 2009 Nominees & Winners
 Academy of Television Arts and Sciences website
 

061
Primetime Emmy Awards
2009 awards in the United States
2009 in Los Angeles
September 2009 events in the United States
Television shows directed by Glenn Weiss